Debelah Laksh Morgan (born September 29, 1977) is an American singer and songwriter. Morgan is best known for her hit single "Dance with Me" off of her third studio album, which reached No. 8 on the Billboard Hot 100.

Early life and education
The owner of a five-octave vocal range, R&B singer Debelah Morgan wrote her first song at the age of eight, soon after forming her own girl's choir and serving as their arranger. At 15, she was teaching gospel choir at the University of Arizona, that same year winning Miss Teen Black Arizona honors; she would later win Miss Black Teen World. Morgan then relocated to Los Angeles, taking home a silver medal in the NAACP international music competition.

Career
She signed with Atlantic Records in 1994, and released her debut album Debelah, which featured the singles "Take It Easy" and "Free", both of which charted on the R&B charts. A couple of years later, she moved to VAZ/Motown Records and released her single "Yesterday" which was a Top 30 R&B hit, and landed on the Pop charts. However, while her second album, It's Not Over, was released in Japan and a few other international territories, it was shelved in the United States in 1998.

Two years later, she re-signed with Atlantic Records and released her biggest single to date, "Dance with Me", which peaked at number 8 on the Billboard Hot 100 in addition to becoming a top-five dance hit. Her third studio album, Dance with Me, soon followed in 2000 and peaked at number 35 on the Billboard Top Heatseekers chart. Two additional singles ("I Remember" and "Close to You") were released from the album. Additionally, she contributed the song "Why Did You Have to Be" to the Osmosis Jones soundtrack and a cover of "Do You Remember?" to the Phil Collins tribute album, Urban Renewal.

In 2005, she signed with the independent label RansomWear and released her fourth album Light at the End of the Tunnel (a gospel release), which was preceded by the single "Just as I Am". The album remains out of print and is not available on any digital services.

In 2010, she released the live album Let the Worship in Champions Live 2 with her Las Vegas church, of which she is their worship leader. The following year, she was slated to have shot a pilot for a reality series with R&B singers Shanice and Karyn White.

In 2012 and 2013, she performed with the R&B group Rose Royce as their lead vocalist for several shows.

In 2015, she collaborated with Shanice and All-4-One on the track "Go to Bed" off the latter's album Twenty.

Discography

Albums

Singles

References

External links
 music.msn.com

1977 births
Living people
American performers of Christian music
Motown artists
Singer-songwriters from Michigan
20th-century African-American women singers
American women pop singers
American dance musicians
American women singer-songwriters
American contemporary R&B singers
Atlantic Records artists
American musicians of Indian descent
American women musicians of Indian descent
20th-century American women singers
21st-century American women singers
20th-century American singers
21st-century American singers
African-American songwriters
21st-century African-American women singers